The Belgrade Six is the name of the group of six Serbian intellectuals arrested in Belgrade, Yugoslavia, in 1984 and charged with counterrevolutionary activity.

Members of the group 
The group consisted of:
 Miodrag Milić
 Milan Nikolić
 Dragomir Olujić
 Vladimir Miljanović
 Gordan Jovanović
 Pavluško Imširović

Trial 
The trial was held between 5 November 1984 and 4 February 1985. It had significant media coverage. One of defence attorneys was Vladimir Šeks.

Cases against Nikolić, Milić and Olujić were separated from the cases of other member of the group. They were sentenced to between one and two-year prison terms.

References

Further reading 
 
 Nebojsa Popov, Disidentska skrivalica, Republika, 2000.
 Srđa Popović, Poslednja instanca, Helsinški odbor za ljudska prava u Srbiji, Beograd, 2003, knjiga 2, 931-1025 str.
 Interview with Pavluško Imširović, Socialist Action, San Francisco, June 1985, p. 15.

1984 in Serbia
1984 in Yugoslavia
1980s in Belgrade
Events in Belgrade
Political repression in Yugoslavia
Quantified groups of defendants